Hospitals in Thailand are operated by both the public and private sector, to provide medical services for prevention, cure and rehabilitation of patients with medical and health-related conditions. The majority are operated by the Ministry of Public Health (MOPH). Private hospitals are regulated by the Medical Registration Division under the MOPH's Department of Health Service Support following the Sanatorium Act, B.E. 2541. Other government units and public organisations also operate hospitals, including the military, universities, local governments and the Red Cross. The full listing of hospitals can be accessed at List of hospitals in Thailand.

Public hospitals 
Most public (i.e., state-owned) hospitals fall under the authority of the Ministry of Public Health. The majority of these are provincial hospitals under the aegis of the Office of the Permanent Secretary of the MOPH. Others are operated by the Department of Medical Services, Department of Mental Health, Department of Health, and Department of Disease Control. Certain non-MOPH state agencies also operate hospitals.

Office of the Permanent Secretary
As of March 2022, there are a total of 901 hospitals under the Office of the Permanent Secretary are classified as follows:

Regional hospitals 
Regional hospitals are found in provincial centres, have a capacity of at least 500 beds and have a comprehensive set of specialists on staff. These hospitals are capable of tertiary care and are under the category A (advanced) service level in the MOPH's service plan. As of 2018, there are a total of 34 regional hospitals in Thailand.

General hospitals 

General hospitals are located in province capitals or major districts and have a capacity of 200 to 500 beds. These hospitals are capable of secondary care and are under the category S and M1 service level. As of 2022, there are total of 92 general hospitals in Thailand.

Community hospitals 
Community hospitals are located in the district level and are usually limited to providing primary care treatment and are under the category M2, F1, F2 and F3 service level. These will refer patients in need of more advanced or specialised care to general or regional hospitals. As of 2022, there are a total of 775 community hospitals in Thailand. Some community hospitals are capable of secondary care. They are further classified by size listed below:
 Large community hospitals have a capacity of 90 to 150 beds.
 Medium community hospitals have a capacity of 60 beds.
 Small community hospitals have a capacity of 10 to 30 beds.

Crown Prince Hospitals (Somdet Phra Yuppharat Hospitals) 
Crown Prince hospitals are community hospitals (except Sa Kaeo, Sawang Daen Din and Det Udom which are general hospitals) with a capacity of 30 to 200 beds, all with capabilities of primary care and some providing secondary care. These hospitals are operated by the Crown Prince Hospital Foundation. Construction of 20 Crown Prince hospitals was initiated in 1977, during the prime ministership of Thanin Kraivichien, to provide medical services at distant locations throughout the country and as a present for King Vajiralongkorn's (then Crown Prince) royal marriage on 3 January 1977. There are 21 Crown Prince hospitals in Thailand.

Sub-district Health Promoting Hospitals 
Sub-district Health Promoting Hospitals are hospitals that are operated by either the MOPH or Department of Local Administration and were initially called "health stations". These hospitals only have primary care capabilities and often serve villages within districts. Almost all of these hospitals do not accept inpatients and usually have no doctor on duty for the entire time. Such hospitals therefore will have medical staff entering irregularly from the community hospital within that district. In 2009, Abhisit Vejjajiva's cabinet approved a policy to improve the quality of healthcare services provided at health stations throughout Thailand and funding was allocated into the Thai Khem Khaeng programme to upgrade existing health stations to sub-district health promoting hospitals and improve quality of care.

Other departments
The Department of Medical Services (DMS) operates several public central hospitals in Bangkok, including Rajavithi Hospital and Lerdsin Hospital. It is also responsible for all specialised hospitals, both inside and outside Bangkok, such as the National Cancer Institute, Prasat Neurological Institute, the Queen Sirikit National Institute of Child Health. This is with some exceptions of public specialised hospitals in the field of psychiatry where all hospitals are under the responsibility of the Department of Mental Health (DMH), such as the Somdet Chaopraya Institute of Psychiatry and Srithanya Hospital. Some hospitals are also managed by the Department of Disease Control (DDC), the main hospital being the Bamrasnaradura Infectious Disease Institute.

Non-MOPH agencies

Other organisations also operate public hospitals in Thailand and citizens of Thailand can use their medical services under the Universal Coverage Scheme at no additional cost. These organisations include: 
 Thai Red Cross Society
 Ministry of Defence
 Army Medical Department, Royal Thai Army
 Naval Medical Department, Royal Thai Navy
 Directorate of Medical Services, Royal Thai Air Force
 Medical Division, Armed Forces Academies Preparatory School

 Office of the Surgeon General, Royal Thai Police
 Ministry of Justice
 Ministry of Finance
 Bangkok Metropolitan Administration
 Department of Local Administration
 Pattaya City
 Phuket Provincial Administration
Surat Thani Provincial Administration
 Nakhon Si Thammarat City Municipality
 Udon Thani City Municipality
 Chiang Mai City Municipality
 State Railway of Thailand
Port Authority of Thailand
 Metropolitan Electricity Authority

University-affiliated hospitals 
This type of hospital is affiliated with faculties of medicine at universities and colleges in Thailand. Most of these hospitals are under the responsibility of the Ministry of Higher Education, Science, Research and Innovation and provide medical services at the "super tertiary care" level. These hospitals are equipped with the best resources in Thailand considering they are medical schools for teaching and research. However, in the table below, some hospitals are under the authority of the affiliated university, but are not used for medical student training, but rather only for research purposes or to provide specialised treatment; and some although used for teaching, are not operated by the affiliated university.

CPIRD Medical Education Centers 

In 1994, the cabinet approved of a cooperation between the MOPH and Thai universities to organise a program known as the 'Collaborative Project to Increase Production of Rural Doctors (CPIRD)' in order to increase the number of medical personnel in rural areas of Thailand. To reach these goals, the cabinet set up the CPIRD Office in 1997 to oversee the project's activities. In terms of education, the preclinic level of study (years 1-3) will take place at the student's university or college. At the clinical level of study (years 4-6), study will take place at hospitals all around the country under the guidance of the MOPH. 'Medical Education Centers' have been established for medical students in the CPIRD program at these hospitals. There are currently 45 CPIRD Medical Education Centers in Thailand.

Private hospitals 
Some hospitals in Thailand are operated by the private sector by either a private limited company or a public limited company. Specialised private hospitals in the fields of ophthalmology and dentistry are common.

The term "general hospital", when referring to private hospitals, refer to hospitals which provide non-specialised care. Private hospitals with fewer than 30 beds are officially termed "health centres". Both accept patient admissions.

See also 
 Health in Thailand
Healthcare in Thailand
 List of hospitals in Thailand
 List of medical schools in Thailand

References 

 This article incorporates material from the corresponding Thai article, :th:โรงพยาบาลในประเทศไทย.